Ross High School is a public high school in Ross Township, Butler County, Ohio, United States. It is the only high school in the Ross Local School District which serves Ross Township and Morgan Township. Ross High School has an enrollment of around 850 students. The school's mascot is the Ram. The Rams compete in the Southwest Ohio Conference (SWOC). In 2005, a new high school was built and the old high school became the middle school. At the beginning of the school year in 2015, Ross High School received the National Blue Ribbon Award.

Arts and Activities 

Ross Band Of Class
The Ross High School Band of Class Marching Band consists of over 150 members. The group is the largest organization in the school and competes locally and nationally during the summer and fall. The RHS Band of Class has qualified for state finals 34 consecutive years in a row. They often compete in Disney World and Washington D.C., receiving numerous national awards.

Other Band of Class activities: Concert band, Jazz Band, Pep Band, Color Guard, Winter Guard, and Indoor Percussion.

Ross Legacy
is Ross High School's Competitive Show Choir. This groups competes each winter throughout Ohio, West Virginia, and Indiana, in addition to local community events. Legacy has consistently ranked at the top of the Large Mixed Division, earning numerous awards such as Best Vocals, Best Choreography, Best Band and Grand Champions. The group prides itself on unique show concepts, dynamic vocals, and precision choreography. The ensemble is accompanied by a live student band and assisted by a fully staffed crew of students. Members are admitted through audition only.

In 2017, the group decided to change its original name, "Ross Rhythm and Motion", to "Ross Legacy."

Academics 
Ross High School is a top performing school in Butler County, Ohio.  They offer several Advance Placement and Dual Enrollment courses, as well as a wide range of traditional high school courses.  Ross High School is rated 87.25/100 by U.S News and is ranked in the top 80 high schools in the state of Ohio. Ross has an Advance Placement Test pass rate of 66% and over 35% of Seniors are enrolled in Advance Placement courses.

Ohio High School Athletic Association State Championships
Boys Basketball – 1980 
Girls Softball - 2009

Individual State Champions
2019 Boys Wrestling- Alex Coleman
2002 Boys Track and field 800 meter Run - Jake Richards
1993 Boys Track and field 800 meter Run - Mike Bruening

Notable alumni
Simon Stepaniak, a drafted NFL player in 2020 for the Green Bay Packers but placed on the retired list in 2021.

References

External links
 District Website

High schools in Butler County, Ohio
Public high schools in Ohio
Buildings and structures in Hamilton, Ohio
2005 establishments in Ohio